A selfmate is a chess problem in which White, moving first, must force Black to deliver checkmate within a specified number of moves against their will. Selfmates were once known as sui-mates.

Example
The problem shown is a relatively simple example. It is a selfmate in two by Wolfgang Pauly from The Theory of Pawn Promotion, 1912: White moves first and compels Black to deliver checkmate on or before Black's second move.

If White can leave Black with no option but to play Bxg2#, the problem is solved. 
 White might try moving the bishop, but this is no good, as it will allow Black to play a non-capturing bishop move himself, delaying the mate beyond move two;
 moving the knight allows the king to move;
 1.e6 allows 1...exf6 and 2...f5;
 1.f7 or 1.fxe7 allows 1...Kxg7;
 1.g8=Q or 1.g8=R are no good after 1...Bxg2+ 2.Q/Rxg2;
 1.g8=N# checkmates Black, which is entirely wrong;
 1.g8=B is also no good, since after 1...exf6 2.exf6 Bxg2+ the bishop can interpose with 3.Bd5.

The only move by which White can force Black to deliver checkmate on or before move two is 1.c8=N. There are two variations: 
 1...exf6 2.exf6 Bxg2# is a selfmate;
 1...e6 allows 2.g8=B (the e6 pawn blocks 3.Bd5), forcing 2...Bxg2# and selfmate.
Note that only a promotion to a knight works on move one: any other piece would be able to interpose after 1...Bxg2+.

Record problems

The current record for the longest selfmate problem is a selfmate in 203, composed by Karlheinz Bachmann and Christopher Jeremy Morse in 2006. The puzzle is based on a 1922 342-move composition by Ottó Titusz Bláthy, which was later found to be cooked.

Prior to December 2021, the record for the longest selfmate problem was a 359-move problem, created by Andriy Stetsenko in 2016. Unfortunately, this problem was later found to be cooked, as a shorter solution exists.

The record for longest 7-piece selfmate problem is a 298-move problem, which was created by William Shinkman.

Variations
A derivative of the selfmate is the reflexmate, in which White compels Black to give mate with the added condition that if either player can give mate, they must (when this condition applies only to Black, it is a semi-reflexmate). There is also the maximummer, in which Black must always make the geometrically longest move available, as measured from square-centre to square-centre; although this condition is sometimes found in other types of problems, it is most common in selfmates. Another variation is the series-selfmate, a type of seriesmover in which White makes a series of moves without reply, at the end of which Black makes one move and is compelled to give mate.

See also
Helpmate
Zugzwang, forcing a move (compulsion to move)

References

Further reading

Chess problems